Misfire: The Rise and Fall of the Shooting Gallery is a 2013 documentary about the American independent film distributor The Shooting Gallery, directed by Whitney Ransick. The film had its world premiere on October 11, 2013 at the Hamptons International Film Festival.

Synopsis
The documentary looks at the independent film distribution company The Shooting Gallery, which experienced a rise in popularity due to their distribution of films like You Can Count on Me and Laws of Gravity. Ransick looks at the company starting with their start in the early nineties to their crash in later years.

Appearances
Listed alphabetically

Ray Angelic
Miguel Arteta
Mark Chandler Bailey
Eamonn Bowles
Peter Broderick
Maggie Carino Ganias
Jamie Chvotkin
Barry Cole
Edie Falco
Hampton Fancher
George Feaster
F.X. Feeney
James Foley
Elizabeth Garnder
Steven Gaydos
Nick Gomez
Bob Gosse
Matthew Harrison
Ted Hope
J. Christian Ingvordsen
William Jennings
Eli Kabilio
Jason Kliot
Danny Leiner
Tim Blake Nelson
Amy Nicken
Amos Poe
Whitney Ransick
Brandon Rosser
Larry Russo
James Schamus
John Sloss
Holly Sorenson
Paul Speaker
Michael Spiller
Morgan Spurlock
Henry Thomas
Lina Todd
Adam Trese
Robin Tunney
Christine Vachon
Chris Walsh
Boaz Yakin

Reception
Indiewire gave a favorable review of Misfire: The Rise and Fall of the Shooting Gallery, writing that "What makes “Misfire” so powerful is that it isn’t just the story of the Shooting Gallery — which is tragic but one that doesn’t resonate all that well today because their output was often iffy and unmemorable — but the story of independent cinema of that period." The Hollywood Reporter and Grolsch Film Works were more mixed in their reviews and The Hollywood Reporter commented that "Gosse comes across sympathetically, and the film captures the shock of the company's 2001 collapse. But the "rise and fall" chronology is thinner than it should be, leaving us to marvel at the train wreck without exposing anything new about its causes."

References

External links
 

Documentary films about the cinema of the United States
2013 documentary films
2013 films
American documentary films
2010s English-language films
2010s American films